The 2013 Oman Super Cup was the 11th edition of the Oman Super Cup, an annual football match between Al-Suwaiq Club, the champions of the 2012–13 Oman Elite League and the 2012–13 Sultan Qaboos Cup and Fanja SC, the runners-up of the 2012–13 Oman Elite League. The match was played at the Al-Seeb Stadium in Al-Seeb, Oman.

Match details

References

External links
2013 Oman Super Cup - SOCCERWAY
2013 Oman Super Cup - Goalzz.com
2014 Oman Super Cup - ofa.om
2014 Oman Super Cup - YouTube
2014 Oman Super Cup - YouTube
النهضة وفنجاء يبحثان عن أول ألقاب الموسم الكروي - alwatan.com

Oman Super Cup seasons
Cup
Oman